Michael John Warrender Lobban, FBA (born 22 October 1962) is a South African legal historian. He has been Professor of Legal History at the London School of Economics since 2013, having previously been Professor of Legal History at Queen Mary University of London (2003–13).

Career 
Michael Lobban was born in Cape Town on 22 October 1962. He was educated at Corpus Christi College, Cambridge, graduating with a Bachelor of Arts degree in 1984, and then studying for a doctorate there. His PhD was awarded in 1988 for his thesis "The development of common law theory: English jurisprudence c. 1760 – c. 1830". After holding a junior lectureship at the University of the Witwatersrand in 1988, he was elected to a junior research fellowship at St John's College, Oxford, in 1988. In 1991, he was appointed to a lectureship at Durham University, and promoted to a readership there four years later. In 1997 he joined Brunel University London as a reader, and in 2000 took up a readership at Queen Mary University of London, where he was appointed Professor of Legal History in 2003. In 2013, he moved to the London School of Economics to be Professor of Legal History.

According to his British Academy profile, Lobban specialises in the "history of eighteenth and nineteenth century English law and lawyers, with a special focus on the relationship between doctrine, institutions and legal and political thought".

He serves as Secretary of the Selden Society.

Honours and awards 
In 2015, Lobban was elected a Fellow of the British Academy, the United Kingdom's national academy for the humanities and social sciences.

Selected publications 
 The Common Law and English Jurisprudence, 1760–1850 (Clarendon Press, 1991).
 White Man's Justice: South African Political Trials in the Black Consciousness Era (Oxford University Press, 1996).
 A History of the Philosophy of Law in the Common Law World, 1600–1900 (Springer, 2007).
 (Co-authored with William Cornish, J. Stuart Anderson, Ray Cocks, Patrick Polden, and Keith Smith) The Oxford History of the Laws of England, vols. 11–13 (2010).

References 

Living people
1962 births
Legal historians
Fellows of the British Academy
Academics of Durham University